6 Years or Six Years may refer to:

6 Years, 2015 film
Six Years, novel by Harlan Coben 
Six years, play by Sharr White 2007